Harvey B. Dunn (August 19, 1894 – February 21, 1968) was an American television and film actor. Dunn was best known for his appearances in several 1950s B movies including three Ed Wood films, Bride of the Monster (1955), Night of the Ghouls (1959), and The Sinister Urge (1961). He also appeared in Wood's television pilot, Crossroad Avenger: The Adventures of the Tucson Kid. He co-starred in the 1959 cult film Teenagers from Outer Space. Dunn additionally performed in a USO show Three Men or a Horse, singing as part of a male quartet.

Trademark
Dunn is often identified by his missing index finger on his right hand. Called "the man with the missing finger" by such periodicals as The Times Record, Dunn lost his finger at the age of 13. Dunn became so tired of explaining how he lost his finger, initially he would lie and say it was run
over by a steamer or it had been nipped off by a woodpecker. Finally, he had a printed card that explained its loss:

Filmography

References

External links
 

Male actors from South Dakota
American male film actors
American male television actors
Deaths from cirrhosis
1894 births
1968 deaths
20th-century American male actors